In graph theory, the rectilinear minimum spanning tree (RMST) of a set of n points in the plane (or more generally, in ℝd) is a minimum spanning tree of that set, where the weight of the edge between each pair of points is the rectilinear distance between those two points.

Properties and algorithms

By explicitly constructing the complete graph on n vertices, which has n(n-1)/2 edges, a rectilinear minimum spanning tree can be found using existing algorithms for finding a minimum spanning tree. In particular, using Prim's algorithm with an adjacency matrix yields time complexity O(n2).

Planar case

In the planar case, more efficient algorithms exist. They are based on the idea that connections may only happen with the nearest neighbour of a point in each octant - that is, each of the eight regions of the plane delimited by the coordinate axis from this point and their bisectors.

The resulting graph has only a linear number of edges and can be constructed in O(n log n) using a divide and conquer algorithm or a sweep line algorithm.

Applications

Electronic design
The problem commonly arises in physical design of electronic circuits. In modern high-density integrated circuits wire routing is performed by wires which consist of segments running horizontally in one layer of metal and vertically in another metal layer. As a result, the wire length between two points is naturally measured with rectilinear distance. Although the routing of a whole net with multiple nodes is better represented by the rectilinear Steiner tree, the RMST provides a reasonable approximation and wire length estimate.

See also
Euclidean minimum spanning tree

References

Computational geometry
Geometric graphs
Spanning tree